Twelve is the name given to the musical recordings made by Chris Olley, the lead singer of Six By Seven. Originally created as a separate side-project to Six By Seven, Twelve albums feature a mixture of ambient, instrumental, electronica and heavier, guitar-laden tracks.

The first album came out of a concept for twelve songs to be released over 6 singles. However, the tracks were released as an import only album through US label Silber. The second album, Be Careful What You Don't Wish For, was released after the 2005 breakup of Six By Seven and prior to their reunion in early 2007.

In 2008 Twelve released the instrumental 'electro Kraut' album Twelve:03 which received critical acclaim in some areas of the press. Since then 3 additional internet only albums have been released, "Housten We Have No Problem" parts 1 & 2 and Twelve:03 part 2, bringing the project to its conclusion.

Discography

Albums
First Album (2003)
Be Careful What You Don't Wish For (2006)
03 (2007)
Houston We Have No Problem (2008)
Houston We Have No Problem II - Raumschiff Schlaf Symphonie (2008)

References

External links
Official Twelve Page
Review of Twelve's First Album
Interview with Chris olley
Chris Olley's website
Twelve's Myspace
Official six.byseven website

Musicians from Nottinghamshire